In mathematics, the Sturm sequence of a univariate polynomial  is a sequence of polynomials associated with  and its derivative by a variant of Euclid's algorithm for polynomials. Sturm's theorem expresses the number of distinct real roots of  located in an interval in terms of the number of changes of signs of the values of the Sturm sequence at the bounds of the interval.

Whereas the fundamental theorem of algebra readily yields the overall number of complex roots, counted with multiplicity, it does not provide a procedure for calculating them. Sturm's theorem counts the number of distinct real roots and locates them in intervals. By subdividing the intervals containing some roots, it can isolate the roots into arbitrarily small intervals, each containing exactly one root. This yields the oldest real-root isolation algorithm, and arbitrary-precision root-finding algorithm for univariate polynomials.

For computing over the reals, Sturm's theorem is less efficient than other methods based on Descartes' rule of signs. However, it works on every real closed field, and, therefore, remains fundamental for the theoretical study of the computational complexity of decidability and quantifier elimination in the first order theory of real numbers.

The Sturm sequence and Sturm's theorem are named after Jacques Charles François Sturm, who discovered the theorem in 1829.

The theorem
The Sturm chain or Sturm sequence of a univariate polynomial  with real coefficients is the sequence of polynomials  such that 

This number of sign variations is denoted here . 

At  the sign of a polynomial is the sign of its leading coefficient for a polynomial of even degree, and the opposite sign for a polynomial of odd degree.

When  passes through a root of  the number of sign variations of  decreases from 1 to 0. These are the only values of  where some sign may change.

Example
Suppose we wish to find the number of roots in some range for the polynomial . So

.  
. 
.
As this is a constant, this finishes the computation of the Sturm sequence.

Thus

where  denotes the number of sign changes in the sequence, which shows that  has two real roots.

Generalization
Sturm sequences have been generalized in two directions. To define each polynomial in the sequence, Sturm used the negative of the remainder of the Euclidean division of the two preceding ones. The theorem remains true if one replaces the negative of the remainder by its product or quotient by a positive constant or the square of a polynomial. It is also useful (see below) to consider sequences where the second polynomial is not the derivative of the first one.

A generalized Sturm sequence is a finite sequence of polynomials with real coefficients

such that
  does not have any real root or has no sign changes near its real roots.

The last condition implies that two consecutive polynomials do not have any common real root. In particular the original Sturm sequence is a generalized Sturm sequence, if (and only if) the polynomial has no multiple real root (otherwise the first two polynomials of its Sturm sequence have a common root).

In this case, if one continues the computation with the polynomial replaced by its quotient by the nonnegative factor, one gets a generalized Sturm sequence, which may also be used for computing the number of real roots, since the proof of Sturm's theorem still applies (because of the third condition).

Use of pseudo-remainder sequences
In computer algebra, the polynomials that are considered have integer coefficients or may be transformed to have integer coefficients. The Sturm sequence of a polynomial with integer coefficients generally contains polynomials whose coefficients are not integers (see above example). 

To avoid computation with rational numbers, a common method is to replace Euclidean division by pseudo-division for computing polynomial greatest common divisors.

Various pseudo-remainder sequences have been designed for computing greatest common divisors of polynomials with integer coefficients without introducing denominators (see Pseudo-remainder sequence).

Root isolation

For a polynomial with real coefficients, root isolation consists of finding, for each real root, an interval that contains this root, and no other roots. 

This is useful for root finding, allowing the selection of the root to be found and providing a good starting point for fast numerical algorithms such as Newton's method; it is also useful for certifying the result, as if Newton's method converge outside the interval one may immediately deduce that it converges to the wrong root.

Root isolation is also useful for computing with algebraic numbers. For computing with algebraic numbers, a common method is to represent them as a pair of a polynomial to which the algebraic number is a root, and an isolation interval. For example  may be unambiguously represented by 

Sturm's theorem provides a way for isolating real roots that is less efficient (for polynomials with integer coefficients) than other methods involving Descartes' rule of signs. However, it remains useful in some circumstances, mainly for theoretical purposes, for example for algorithms of real algebraic geometry that involve infinitesimals.

For isolating the real roots, one starts from an interval  containing all the real roots, or the roots of interest (often, typically in physical problems, only positive roots are interesting), and one computes  and  For defining this starting interval, one may use bounds on the size of the roots (see ). When one encounters, during this process an interval that does not contain any root, it may be suppressed from the list of intervals to consider. When one encounters an interval containing exactly one root, one may stop dividing it, as it is an isolation interval. The process stops eventually, when only isolating intervals remain. 

This isolating process may be used with any method for computing the number of real roots in an interval. Theoretical complexity analysis and practical experiences show that methods based on Descartes' rule of signs are more efficient. It follows that, nowadays, Sturm sequences are rarely used for root isolation.

Application
Generalized Sturm sequences allow counting the roots of a polynomial where another polynomial is positive (or negative), without computing these root explicitly. If one knows an isolating interval for a root of the first polynomial, this allows also finding the sign of the second polynomial at this particular root of the first polynomial, without computing a better approximation of the root.

Let  and  be two polynomials with real coefficients such that  and  have no common root and  has no multiple roots. This restriction does not really affect the generality of what follows as GCD computations allows reducing the general case to this case, and the cost of the computation of a Sturm sequence is the same as that of a GCD. 

See also

 Routh–Hurwitz theorem
 Hurwitz's theorem (complex analysis)
 Descartes' rule of signs
 Rouché's theorem
 Properties of polynomial roots
 Gauss–Lucas theorem
 Turán's inequalities

References

 
 
 
 
 
 
 
 

 
 
Baumol, William. Economic Dynamics, chapter 12, Section 3, "Qualitative information on real roots"
 D.G. Hook and P. R. McAree, "Using Sturm Sequences To Bracket Real Roots of Polynomial Equations" in Graphic Gems I (A. Glassner ed.), Academic Press, pp. 416–422, 1990.

Theorems in real analysis
Articles containing proofs
Theorems about polynomials
Computer algebra
Real algebraic geometry